This is a partial list of Egyptologists. An Egyptologist is any archaeologist, historian, linguist, or art historian who specializes in Egyptology, the scientific study of Ancient Egypt and its antiquities. Demotists are Egyptologists who specialize in the study of the Demotic language and field of Demotic Studies. Although a practitioner of the disciplined study of Ancient Egypt and Egyptian antiquities is an "Egyptologist", the field of Egyptology is not exclusive to such practitioners.

A

Barbara G. Adams (British, 1945–2002)
Johan David Åkerblad (Swedish, 1763–1819)
Cyril Aldred (British, 1914–1991)
James Peter Allen (American, born 1945)
Maurice Alliot (French, 1903–1960)
Hartwig Altenmüller (German, born 1938)
Émile Amélineau (French, 1850–1915)
Alessia Amenta (Italian)
Guillemette Andreu (French, born 1948)
Tadeusz Andrzejewski (Polish, 1923–1961)
Jan Assmann (German, born 1938)
Éric Aubourg (French)
Sydney Hervé Aufrère (French, born 1951)
A.-C.-T.-Émile Prisse d'Avennes (French, 1807–1879)
Edward Russell Ayrton (British, 1882–1914)

B

Alexander Badawy (Egyptian, 1913–1986)
John Robert Baines (British, born 1946)
Pascale Ballet (French, born 1953)
Émile Baraize (French, 1874–1952)
Alessandro Barsanti (Italian, 1858–1917)
Hussein Bassir (Egyptian, born 1973)
Marcelle Baud (French, 1890–1987)
Michel Baud (French, 1963–2012)
Alfred Chester Beatty (American, 1875–1968)
Nathalie Beaux-Grimal (French, born 1960)
Jürgen von Beckerath (German, 1920–2016)
Giovanni Battista Belzoni (Italian, 1778–1823)
Georges Aaron Bénédite (French 1857–1926)
Yosef Ben-Jochannan (American, 1918–2015)
Margaret Benson (English, 1865–1916)
Susanne Bickel (Swiss, born 1960)
Manfred Bietak (Austrian, born 1940)
Friedrich Wilhelm von Bissing (German, 1873–1956)
Fernand Bisson de la Roque (French, 1885–1958)
Aylward Manley Blackman (British, 1883–1956)
C. Blankenberg-van Delden (Dutch, 1906–1994)
Edward Bleiberg (American, born 1951)
Martin Bommas (German, born 1967)
Charlotte Booth (British, born 1975)
Ludwig Borchardt (German, 1863–1938)
Käthe Bosse-Griffiths (German-British, 1910–1998)
Urbain Bouriant (French, 1849–1903)
Peter J. Brand (Canadian-American, born 1967)
James Henry Breasted (American, 1865–1935)
Edda Bresciani (Italian, 1930–2020)
Bob Brier (American, born 1943)
Edwin C. Brock (American, 1946–2015)
Mary Brodrick (British, 1858–1933)
Myrtle Florence Broome (British, 1888–1978)
Émile Brugsch (German, 1842–1930)
Heinrich Karl Brugsch (German, 1827–1894)
Guy Brunton (English, 1878–1948)
Betsy Bryan (American, born 1949)
E. A. Wallis Budge (British, 1857–1934)
Harry Burton (British, 1879–1940)
James Burton (British, 1788–1862)

C

Agnès Cabrol (French, 1964–2007)
Arthur Callender (British, 1875–1936)
Amice Calverley (British-Canadian, 1896–1959)
Ricardo Caminos (Argentinian, 1916–1992)
Jean Capart (Belgian, 1877–1947)
George Herbert, 5th Earl of Carnarvon (English, 1866–1923)
Howard Carter (British, 1874–1939)
Giovanni Battista Caviglia (Italian, 1770–1845)
Jaroslav Černý (Czech, 1898–1970)
François Chabas (French, 1817–1882)
Jean-François Champollion (French, 1790–1832)
Émile Gaston Chassinat (French, 1868–1948)
Charles Chipiez (French, 1835–1901)
Somers Clarke (English, 1841–1926)
Jean Clédat (French, 1871–1943)
Kathlyn M. Cooney (American)
Jean-Pierre Corteggiani (French, born 1942)
Pearce Paul Creasman (American, born 1981)
Gwendolen Crewdson (British, 1872-1913)
Winifred M. Crompton (British, 1870–1932)
Silvio Curto (Italian, 1919–2015)

D
Alec Naylor Dakin (English, 1912–2003)
Alicia Daneri (Argentine, born 1942)
Georges Émile Jules Daressy (French, 1864–1938)
François Daumas (French, 1918–1984)
Françoise Dunand (French, born 1934)
Colleen Darnell (American, born 1980)
John Coleman Darnell (American, born 1962)
Nina de Garis Davies (American, 1881–1965)
Norman de Garis Davies (American, 1865–1941)
Theodore M. Davis (American, 1837–1915)
Théodule Devéria (French, 1831–1871)
Aidan Dodson (English, born 1962)
Sergio Donadoni (Italian, 1914–2015)
Günter Dreyer (German, 1943-2019)
Étienne Drioton (French, 1889–1961)
Bernardino Drovetti (Italian, 1776–1852)
Johannes Dümichen (German, 1833–1894)

E

Bendix Ebbell (Norwegian, 1865–1941)
Georg Ebers (German, 1837–1898)
Dorothy Eady (English, 1904–1981)
Campbell Cowan Edgar (British, 1870–1938)
Amelia Edwards (British, 1831–1892)
Iorwerth Eiddon Stephen Edwards (British, 1909–1996)
August Eisenlohr (German, 1832–1902)
Walter Bryan Emery (British, 1903–1971)
Jean-Yves Empereur (French, born 1952)
Reginald Engelbach (British, 1888–1946)
Adolf Erman (German, 1854–1937)

F
Raymond O. Faulkner (British 1894–1982)
Cecil Mallaby Firth (British, 1878–1931)
Henry George Fischer (American, 1923–2006)
Hans-Werner Fischer-Elfert (German, born 1954)
Joann Fletcher (British, born 1966)
Georges Foucart (French, 1865–1943)
Detlef Franke (German, 1952–2007)
Henri Frankfort (Dutch, 1897–1954)
Henning Franzmeier (German)
George Willoughby Fraser (British, 1866–1923)
Renée Friedman (American)
Elizabeth Frood (New Zealand)

G

Marc Gabolde (French, born 1957)
Alan Gardiner (British, 1879–1963)
Jean Sainte-Fare Garnot (French, 1908–1963)
John Garstang (British, 1876–1956)
Henri Gauthier (French, 1877–1950)
Joseph Étienne Gautier (French, 1861–1924)
John Gee (American, born 1964)
Paul Ghalioungui (Egyptian, 1908–1987)
Stephen Ranulph Kingdon Glanville (British 1900–1956)
Orly Goldwasser (Israeli)
Vladimir Golenishchev (Russian, 1856–1947)
Zakaria Goneim (Egyptian, 1905–1959)
Charles Wycliffe Goodwin (English, 1817–1878)
Janet Gourlay (Scottish, 1863–1912)
Georges Goyon (French, 1905–1996)
Pierre Grandet (French, born 1954)
Hermann Grapow (German, 1885–1967)
Eugène Grébaut (French, 1846–1915)
Bernard Pyne Grenfell (British, 1869–1926)
Francis Llewellyn Griffith (British, 1862–1934)
Nora Griffith (British, 1870–1937)
Nicolas Grimal (French, born 1948)
Sarah Israelit Groll (Israeli, 1925–2007)
Battiscombe Gunn (English, 1883–1950)

H

Labib Habachi (Egyptian, 1906–1984)
Hermine Hartleben (German, 1846–1918)
Selim Hassan (Egyptian, 1887–1961)
Zahi Hawass (Egyptian, born 1947)
William C. Hayes (American, 1903–1963)
Wolfgang Helck (German, 1914–1993)
Johann Jakob Hess (Swiss, 1866–1949)
James K. Hoffmeier (American, born 1951)
Erik Hornung (Swiss, born 1933)
Arthur Surridge Hunt (British, 1871–1934)
Brian M. Hauglid (American, born 1954)

I

Salima Ikram (Pakistani, born 1965)
Sergei Ignatov (Bulgarian, born 1960)

J
Christian Jacq (French, born 1947)
Thomas Garnet Henry James (British, 1923–2009)
Gustave Jéquier (Swiss, 1868–1946)
Jean-Baptiste Jollois (French, 1776–1842)
Edme-François Jomard (French, 1777–1862)
Pierre Jouguet (French, 1869–1949)
Hermann Junker (German, 1877–1962)

K

László Kákosy (Hungarian, 1932–2003)
Ahmed Kamal (Egyptian, 1851–1923)
Naguib Kanawati (Egyptian-Australian, born 1941)
Peter Kaplony (Hungarian-Swiss, 1933–2011)
Barry Kemp (British)
Jean Kérisel (French, 1908–2005)
Athanasius Kircher (German, 1602–1680)
Kenneth Anderson Kitchen (British, born 1932)
Giovanni Kminek-Szedlo (Czech-Italian, 1828–1896)
Jirō Kondō (Japanese, born 1951)
Charles Kuentz (French, 1895–1978)

L
Pierre Lacau (French, 1873–1963)
Violette Lafleur (Canadian, 1897–1965)
Jean-Philippe Lauer (French, 1902–2001)
Jean Leclant (French, 1920–2011)
Conradus Leemans (Dutch, 1809–1893)
Eugène Lefébure (French, 1838–1908)
Gustave Lefebvre (French, 1879–1957)
Georges Legrain (French, 1865–1917)
Mark Lehner (American)
Oscar Lemm (Russian, 1856–1918)
Charles Lenormant (French, 1802–1859)
Karl Richard Lepsius (German, 1810–1884)
Leonard H. Lesko (American, born 1938)
František Lexa (Czech, 1876–1960)
Nestor L'Hôte (French, 1804–1842)
Miriam Lichtheim (Israeli, 1914–2004)
Jadwiga Lipińska (Polish, 1932–2009)
Jens Lieblein (Norwegian, 1827–1911)
Victor Loret (French, 1859–1946)

M

Arthur Cruttenden Mace (British, 1874–1928)
Auguste Ferdinand François Mariette (French, 1821–1881)
Gaston Maspero (French, 1846–1916)
Bernard Mathieu (French, born 1959)
Bernadette Menu (French, born 1942)
Barbara Mertz (American, 1927–2013)
Kazimierz Michałowski (Polish, 1901–1981)
Béatrix Midant-Reynes (French)
Nicholas Millet (American, 1934–2004)
Sir Robert Mond (British, 1867–1938)
Pierre Montet (French, 1885–1966)
Ludwig David Morenz (German, born 1965)
Alexandre Moret (French, 1868–1938)
Jacques de Morgan (French, 1857–1924)
Rosalind Moss (British, 1890–1990)
Tycho Q. Mrsich (German, 1925–2022)
William J. Murnane (American, 1945–2000)
Margaret Alice Murray (Anglo-Indian, 1863–1963)
Karol Myśliwiec (Polish, born 1943)

N
Édouard Naville (Swiss, 1844–1926)
Alessandra Nibbi (Australian, 1923–2007)
Christiane Desroches Noblecourt (French, 1913–2011)

O
David O'Connor (Australian, born 1938)
Boyo Ockinga (German-Australian)

P

Laure Pantalacci (French)
Sarah Parcak (American)
Richard Anthony Parker (American, 1905–1993)
Richard B. Parkinson (British, born 1963) 
Thomas Eric Peet (British, 1882–1934)
John Pendlebury (British, 1904–1941)
John Shae Perring (British, 1813–1869)
Hilda Petrie (Irish, 1871–1957)
William Flinders Petrie (British, 1853–1942)
Karl Piehl (Swedish, 1853–1904)
Willem Pleyte (Dutch, 1836–1903)
André Pochan (French, 1891–19??)
Paule Posener-Kriéger (French, 1925—1996)

Q 
Joachim Friedrich Quack (German, born 1966)
James Edward Quibell (British, 1867–1935)
Stephen Quirke (British)

R

David Randall-MacIver (British-American, 1873–1945)
Maarten Raven (Dutch, born 1953)
John D. Ray (British, born 1945)
Donald B. Redford (Canadian, born 1934)
Nicholas Reeves (English, born 1956)
Adolphe Reinach (French, 1887–1914)
George Andrew Reisner (American, 1867–1942)
Peter le Page Renouf (English, 1822–1897)
Eugène Revillout (French, 1843–1913)
Alexander Henry Rhind (Scottish, 1833–1863)
Herbert Ricke (German, 1901–1976)
Robert K. Ritner (American, 1953–2021)
David Roberts (Scottish, 1796–1864)
Gay Robins (British-American, born 1951)
David Rohl (British, born 1950)
Ippolito Rosellini (Italian, 1800–1843)
Emmanuel de Rougé (French, 1811–1872)
François Michel de Rozière (French, 1775–1842)
Otto Rubensohn (German, 1867–1964)
Donald P. Ryan (American, born 1957)
Kim Ryholt (American/Danish, born 1970)

S

Henry Salt (Brite, 1780–1827)
Helmut Satzinger (Austrian, born 1938)
Serge Sauneron (French, 1927–1976)
Claude-Étienne Savary (French, 1750–1788)
Otto Schaden (American, 1937–2015)
Hans Heinrich Schaeder (German, 1896–1957)
Jean-Vincent Scheil (French, 1858–1940)
Ernesto Schiaparelli (Italian, 1856–1928)
René Schwaller de Lubicz (French, 1887–1961)
Girolamo Segato (Italian, 1792–1836)
Kurt Heinrich Sethe (German, 1869–1934)
Gustav Seyffarth (German-American, 1796–1885)
Ian Shaw (British, born 1961)
David P. Silverman (American, born 1943) 
William Kelly Simpson (American, 1928–2017)
Edwin Smith (American, 1822–1906)
Grafton Elliot Smith (Australian, 1871–1937)
Wilhelm Spiegelberg (German, 1870–1930)
Rainer Stadelmann (German, 1933–2019)
Danijela Stefanovic (Serbian, born 1973)
Georg Steindorff (German, 1861–1951)
Vasily Vasilievich Struve (Russian, 1889–1965)
Zbigniew Szafrański (Polish)

T
Mahmoud Maher Taha (Egyptian, born 1942)
Rifa'a al-Tahtawi (Egyptian, 1801–1873)
 Christoffer Theis (German, *1984)
Elizabeth Thomas (American, 1907–1986)
Herbert Thompson (British, 1859–1944)
Claude Traunecker (French, born 1943)
Bruce Trigger (Canadian, 1937–2006)
Boris Turayev (Russian, 1868–1920)
Joyce Tyldesley (British, born 1960)

U
Peter Ucko (British, 1938–2007)

V

Jeanne Marie Thérèse Vandier d'Abbadie (French, 1899–1977)
Alexandre Varille (French, 1909–1951)
Luigi Vassalli (Italian, 1812–1887)
Jean Vercoutter (French, 1911–2000)
Jozef Vergote (Belgian, 1910–1992)
Miroslav Verner (Czech, born 1941)
Édouard de Villiers du Terrage (French, 1780–1855)
Richard William Howard Vyse (British, 1784–1853)

W
William Ayres Ward (American, 1928–1996)
Kent R. Weeks (American, born 1941)
Arthur Weigall (British, 1880–1934)
Josef W. Wegner (American, born 1967)
Fred Wendorf (American, 1924–2015)
Willeke Wendrich (Dutch-American, born 1961)
Edward Frank Wente (American, born 1930)
Marcelle Werbrouck (Belgian, 1889–1959)
Wolfhart Westendorf (German, 1924–2018)
Charles Edwin Wilbour (American, 1833–1896)
John Gardner Wilkinson (British, 1797–1875)
Richard H. Wilkinson (American, born 1951)
Toby Wilkinson (British, born 1969)
Hilary Wilson (British, born mid 20th century)
John A. Wilson (American, 1899–1976)
Herbert Eustis Winlock (American, 1884–1950)
Walter Wreszinski (German, 1880–1935)

Y
Sakuji Yoshimura (Japanese, born 1943)
Thomas Young (British, 1773–1829)
Jean Yoyotte (French, 1927–2009)

Z
Zbyněk Žába (Czech, 1917–1971)
Louis Vico Žabkar (1914–1994)
Hilde Zaloscer (Austrian, 1903–1999)
Christiane Ziegler (French, born 1942)

Fictional egyptologists
Evelyn Carnahan (The Mummy (1999 film))
Lara Croft (Tomb Raider)
Amelia P. Emerson and the Emerson Family (Crocodile on the Sandbank)
Daniel Jackson (Stargate, Stargate SG–1)
Indiana Jones (Raiders of the Lost Ark)
Sarah Page (Primeval)
Sophocles Sarcophagus (The Adventures of Tintin)

See also
List of female Egyptologists

External links
International Directory of Egyptology from the International Association of Egyptologists
List of Egyptologists and their publications

 
Egyptologists
Egyptologists